The Renfe Class 447 is a class of electric multiple unit trains built by CAF, Alstom, Siemens, ABB, and Adtranz for Renfe Cercanías, Spain's commuter railway networks. The first units entered service in 1993.

Technical details
Class 447 units use 3 kV DC overhead catenary line electric traction. The maximum speed of Class 447 units in service is 120 km/h.

Cities and routes
Class 447 units operate on the following networks:
 Rodalies de Catalunya
 Cercanías Valencia
 Cercanías San Sebastián
 Cercanías Santander
 Cercanías Madrid
 Rodalies Girona
 Rodalies Tarragona

Gallery

See also

Cercanías
Renfe

External links

Ferropedia - Renfe Serie 447 (Spanish)
Renfe - Our Trains

CAF multiple units
Cercanías
Renfe multiple units
Siemens multiple units
3000 V DC multiple units